This is a list of motor vehicle deaths in Australia by year. It shows the annual number of road fatalities (road deaths or Road toll) per capita per year, per vehicle and per vehicle-km in the year the data was collected. The list includes all road users such as drivers, passengers, pedestrians, motorcyclists and cyclists.

Graph

See also
List of motor vehicle deaths in Iceland by year
List of motor vehicle deaths in Japan by year
List of motor vehicle deaths in Thailand by year
Motor vehicle fatality rate in U.S. by year

References

Australia transport-related lists
Motor vehicle deaths in Australia by year
Motor vehicle deaths in Australia by year
 
Australia